Hamilton—Wentworth was an electoral riding in Ontario, Canada. It was represented in the Legislative Assembly of Ontario from 1934 to 1971.

Members of Provincial Parliament

See also
 Ancaster—Dundas—Flamborough—Westdale

References

Former provincial electoral districts of Ontario